Marie Pinterová (née Neumannová, born 16 August 1946) is a Czech and Hungarian professional tennis player with a professional career from 1969 to 1989.

Life
Marie Neumannová was born in 1946 in Stará Boleslav. She began her professional career in 1969. In 1974, Pinterová married Hungarian engineer András Pintér. They had one son, Karim, in 1976. Pinterová returned to professional tennis at the age of 34 and won the Tokyo title.

Career
In 1974, she played the quarterfinals at Roland Garros, her best performance in a single round of the Grand Slam. She has won two WTA singles during her career, first in Florida in 1972 (opposite Billie Jean King in the final), the second in Japan in 1981.

During her career, Pinterová has won:
 Two Czech Internationals
 Virginia Slims of Jacksonville
 The Cairo Open
 The Japan Open
 The World University Games

She had wins against Martina Navratilova, Sue Barker and Kathy Jordan.

She has played on the European senior circuit of the ITF since 1995. She has won 11 World singles championship titles and 24 European titles.

References

External links
 
 

1946 births
Living people
Czech female tennis players
Hungarian female tennis players
People from Brandýs nad Labem-Stará Boleslav
Czechoslovak female tennis players
Sportspeople from the Central Bohemian Region